A compost heater (or Biomeiler) is a structure for the energetic use of biomass for the heating of buildings.

A method relying on biological wood oxidation was developed by Jean Pain in the 1970s. Compost heaters are used primarily for demonstration purposes as small systems for heating a house. Local waste can be converted to energy.

Types

Compost heap
The traditional compost heater exploits the heat of a large compost heap to warm a house. This type requires a big heap, intertwined with a spiral water hose. The circulating water conducts heat to the building, where it can be fed to a heating circuit.

The heap must contain at least 8,000 liters of biomass to maintain a temperature during the winter.

For this purpose, chipped wood is usually piled up and a water hose is passed through it. A microbiological degradation process generates heat for up to 24 months. The heat produces hot water, which is then fed to a heating circuit. With sufficient oxygen supply, the biomass is degraded by aerobic decomposition. The activity of the microorganisms can be regulated by the moisture content.

Hot water and biogas

Pain's 'Biomeiler' combines composting with biogas.

The raw materials of Pain's compost heap were saplings, branches and underbrush. He  developed the machines that grind these materials to the proper size. One of his machines, a tractor-driven model, earned fourth prize in the 1978 Grenoble Agricultural Fair. After Pain had ground the raw materials, Pain would construct a heap three metres high and six metres across (10 × 20 feet). This tank was 3/4 full of compost, which had first been steeped in water for two months. The hermetically sealed tank was connected by tubing to 24 truck tire inner tubes, gathered nearby to collect the methane gas. The gas was distilled by washing and compressing it through small stones in water. Pain used the gas for cooking and producing electricity. He also fueled a light van.

It took about 90 days to produce  of gas - enough to keep two ovens and three burner stoves going for a year. The methane-fueled combustion engine drove a generator that produced 100 watts of electricity.  This charged a battery, providing the light needed. Skepticism has been leveled at Pain's estimates for methane extraction and it is not known if anyone has been able to reproduce his results.

Pain's compost heaps generated hot water via  of pipe buried inside the compost mound. The pipe was wrapped around the methane generator with an inlet for cold water and an outlet for hot water. The heat from the decomposing mass produced  of hot water heated to  — enough to meet central heating, bathroom and kitchen requirements. The heap composted for nearly 18 months, after which it was dismantled. The humus was used to mulch soils.

Heater silo

The composting process runs in an airtight container inside a house. The heat can be radiated directly to the interiors of the house or distributed by a heating circuit. An additional water pipe can be vertically built into the silo for warming water.

The silo is the central part of an in-house compost heater. In autumn the silo is filled up with fresh biomass, after which the silo delivers comfortable heat throughout the winter.

Inlet air and outlet air provide the necessary oxygen. The outlet air goes out of the house. Silo moisture is higher than in a regular compost heap. The decay process produces additional water, which is drained at the bottom of the silo. A part of this water enters the top of the silo for better distribution in the processing volume. If pumped periodically or continuously to the top to rinse through the silo, the whole system becomes a wet composting system.

References 

Composting
Heating, ventilation, and air conditioning
Permaculture concepts